Érik Gilbert Comas (born 28 September 1963) is a French former Formula One driver. He was French Formula 3 champion in 1988, and then Formula 3000 champion in 1990, after scoring the same number of points as Jean Alesi in 1989, but losing on a count-back of positions. He participated in 63 Grands Prix, debuting on 10 March 1991.  He scored a total of 7 championship points. His last point, in the 1994 German Grand Prix, was also the last one for the Larrousse team.

Career

Formula One

1991 and 1992: Ligier
After his F3000 championship victory in 1990, Comas was selected to drive for the Ligier F1 team in 1991. The Ligier JS35 with its Lamborghini engine proved uncompetitive throughout the season.  Comas failed to qualify for the race on his first attempt in Brazil, achieved his first finish with 10th at Imola, and achieved his highest finish of the season with 8th in Canada, scoring no points during the season. Although he failed to qualify on two other occasions and suffered a spectacular crash at Hockenheim, he generally compared well with more experienced teammate Thierry Boutsen who also failed to score any points.  Early in 1992, Comas's place in the team was briefly threatened by Alain Prost who tested the team's new Renault-powered car with a view to driving for, and possibly buying the team.  Ultimately Prost chose not to proceed, and Comas retained his drive alongside Boutsen for the season.  The 1992 car, the Ligier JS37 seemed promising, a brand new design featuring the race-winning Renault V10 engine, but it proved to be only inconsistently competitive.  Comas scored his first career F1 point with 6th place in Canada, scored 5th at Ligier's home race in France and a further point in Germany during a mid-season revival of the team's fortunes.  With four points, he was generally faster than and outscored Boutsen, and finished 11th in the Driver's Championship. At the 1992 Belgian Grand Prix Comas was involved in a severe accident at the Blanchimont corner during Saturday qualifying. Left unconscious in his car beached in the middle of the track with the engine still running, Comas was rescued by Ayrton Senna who stopped his own car, ran to help Comas, held the Frenchman's head in a stable position until medical assistance arrived, and shut off the car's screaming engine (which could have blown and started a fire at any moment). Comas credited Senna with saving his life.

1993 and 1994: Larrousse
Comas was not retained by Ligier for 1993. Instead, he signed with the small Larrousse team, running the LH93 chassis powered by Lamborghini V12s.  The car was uncompetitive, Comas  retiring from half the 16 races of the season, and scoring only one point for 6th at Monza. Retained by Larrousse for 1994, Comas drove the LH94 car, now powered by more reliable Ford HB engines. Comas scored a point for 6th at the Pacific Grand Prix, and benefited from the retirement of many other cars to take another point at Hockenheim. This was both his and Larrousse's final F1 points finish. For the last race of the season in Australia, Comas relinquished his seat to make way for Jean-Denis Delétraz who brought more funding to the team.

At the 1994 San Marino Grand Prix Comas was mistakenly waved out of the pits and drove onto the circuit during the red flag which followed the fatal crash of Ayrton Senna. Marshals frantically tried to flag Comas down through the Tamburello corner and he narrowly avoided rescue workers and vehicles, including an aid helicopter which had landed at the scene, before bringing his Larrousse to a stop. Comas declined to participate in the restart of the race, after witnessing medical staff treating the mortally-injured Senna. Senna had previously rushed to Comas's aid when he was knocked unconscious after a serious accident during qualifying for the 1992 Belgian Grand Prix.

After Formula One
After ending his Formula One career at the end of the 1994 season, Comas went to Japan to continue his racing career in the All-Japan Grand Touring Car Championship (JGTC), Japan's premiere racing series. He won the GT500 title in 1998 and 1999, and was runner-up in the standings in 2000, all three years driving for Nissan in a factory Nismo-prepared Skyline GT-R. He left the Nismo team in 2002 to join the factory Toyota team the following year. By the end of the 2003 season, he was the most successful driver in the history of the series, with the most career championship points ever scored by a single driver. This was eventually surpassed by another Nismo driver, Satoshi Motoyama.

Comas spent the 2004/2005 seasons with Masahiro Hasemi's privateer Hasemi Sport team, running non-factory Nissan 350Zs in GT500, including inheriting the team's only win (co-driving with Toshihiro Kaneishi) thus far, on the evening of 18 December 2004 at the "All-Star 200" exhibition race on California Speedway's combined oval/road course after the unofficial winners were penalized 60 seconds on their finishing time for a pit window infraction. The race was a non-points scoring event and as such does not count towards the drivers' or teams' official win record.

In the 2006 Super GT championship season (formerly JGTC) he raced for former JGTC driver and 24 Hours of Le Mans team owner Masahiko Kondo's new privateer Nissan 350Z racing team. He also branched out into rallying, competing in various events around the world. Along with this, he created Comas Racing Management (CRM), a firm that focuses on the management and development of young up and coming drivers, primarily from his home country of France.

At the fifth race of the 2006 season at Sportsland SUGO, Comas was replaced by Seiji Ara due to ill health. After returning for the Pokka 1000 km, on 5 September 2006, Comas announced that because of his health, he would not compete in the final three races of the season.

In 2010 and 2011, he won the electric vehicle category of the Rallye Monte Carlo des Véhicules à Énergie Alternative (the opening event of the FIA Alternative Energies Cup) with a Tesla Roadster. In 2014 he won the Carrera Panamericana in a Studebaker. Between 2012 and 2017,he rallied a Lancia Stratos.

Comas has now retired from all forms of racing. He spends his time running Comas Historic Racing, which provides for paying customers to enter historic rallies driving cars from his fleet of blue Alpine automobiles.

Racing record

Career summary

Complete Macau Grand Prix results

Complete International Formula 3000 results
(key) (Races in bold indicate pole position; races in italics indicate fastest lap.)

Complete Formula One results
(key)

Complete JGTC/Super GT results
(key) (Races in bold indicate pole position) (Races in italics indicate fastest lap)

24 Hours of Le Mans results

Complete JTCC results
(key) (Races in bold indicate pole position) (Races in italics indicate fastest lap)

World Rally Championship results

References

External links

Eric Comas/CRM Official Site
Comas Historic Racing

1963 births
Living people
People from Romans-sur-Isère
French racing drivers
French Formula Renault 2.0 drivers
French Formula One drivers
Ligier Formula One drivers
Larrousse Formula One drivers
International Formula 3000 Champions
French Formula Three Championship drivers
24 Hours of Le Mans drivers
Japanese Touring Car Championship drivers
Super GT drivers
International Formula 3000 drivers
American Le Mans Series drivers
European Le Mans Series drivers
FIA E-Rally Regularity Cup drivers
Sportspeople from Drôme
Carrera Panamericana drivers
DAMS drivers
TOM'S drivers
Nismo drivers
Oreca drivers
Kondō Racing drivers
Pescarolo Sport drivers
Larbre Compétition drivers